Estevan is a former provincial electoral district for the Legislative Assembly of the province of Saskatchewan, Canada. This district was created for the 2nd Saskatchewan general election in 1908. Renamed "Bromhead" in 1934, the constituency was dissolved and combined with the Souris-Estevan district before the 9th Saskatchewan general election in 1938.

It is now part of the provincial constituencies of Estevan and Weyburn-Big Muddy.

Members of the Legislative Assembly

Election results

|-

|Provincial Rights
|Henry Yardley
|align="right"|526
|align="right"|38.85%
|align="right"|–
|- bgcolor="white"
!align="left" colspan=3|Total
!align="right"|1,354
!align="right"|100.00%
!align="right"|

|-

|Conservative
|Henry Yardley
|align="right"|566
|align="right"|34.24%
|align="right"|-4.61
|- bgcolor="white"
!align="left" colspan=3|Total
!align="right"|1,653
!align="right"|100.00%
!align="right"|

|-

|- bgcolor="white"
!align="left" colspan=3|Total
!align="right"|Acclamation
!align="right"|

|-

|Conservative
|James Hill
|align="right"|1,263
|align="right"|39.89%
|align="right"|-
|- bgcolor="white"
!align="left" colspan=3|Total
!align="right"|3,166
!align="right"|100.00%
!align="right"|

|-

|Independent
|Thomas Miller Bryce
|align="right"|687
|align="right"|36.02%
|align="right"|–
|- bgcolor="white"
!align="left" colspan=3|Total
!align="right"|1,907
!align="right"|100.00%
!align="right"|

|-

|- bgcolor="white"
!align="left" colspan=3|Total
!align="right"|Acclamation
!align="right"|

|-

| style="width: 130px"|Independent
|James Forbes Creighton
|align="right"|2,153
|align="right"|55.91%
|align="right"|-

|- bgcolor="white"
!align="left" colspan=3|Total
!align="right"|3,851
!align="right"|100.00%
!align="right"|

|-

|Conservative
|David McKnight
|align="right"|1,691
|align="right"|36.25%
|align="right"|-

|- bgcolor="white"
!align="left" colspan=3|Total
!align="right"|4,665
!align="right"|100.00%
!align="right"|

|-

| style="width: 130px"|Conservative
|David McKnight
|align="right"|2,700
|align="right"|50.13%
|align="right"|+13.88

|- bgcolor="white"
!align="left" colspan=3|Total
!align="right"|5,386
!align="right"|100.00%
!align="right"|

|-

|Farmer-Labour
|Eric Oxelgren
|align="right"|1,208
|align="right"|25.51%
|align="right"|-

|Conservative
|Frances B. Smyth
|align="right"|1,111
|align="right"|23.47%
|align="right"|-26.66
|- bgcolor="white"
!align="left" colspan=3|Total
!align="right"|4,735
!align="right"|100.00%
!align="right"|

See also 
Electoral district (Canada)
List of Saskatchewan provincial electoral districts
List of Saskatchewan general elections
List of political parties in Saskatchewan

References 
 Saskatchewan Archives Board – Saskatchewan Election Results By Electoral Division

Former provincial electoral districts of Saskatchewan